Wood County is a county located in the U.S. state of Ohio. As of the 2020 census, the population was 132,248. Its county seat is Bowling Green. The county was named for Captain Eleazer D. Wood, the engineer for General William Henry Harrison's army, who built Fort Meigs in the War of 1812.

Wood County is part of the Toledo, OH Metropolitan Statistical Area. Its diagonal northwest border is formed by the Maumee River, which has its mouth at Maumee Bay on Lake Erie.

History
Wood County was established on February 12, 1820, following a treaty and land purchase from local Indian tribes. Perrysburg was the first county seat, and remained the county seat until 1870, when it was moved to Bowling Green.

Wood County established its first health department in 1920.

During the Great Depression in 1933 Wood County was the site of an early penny auction.

Geography

Adjacent counties
 Lucas County (north)
 Ottawa County (northeast)
 Sandusky County (east)
 Seneca County (southeast)
 Hancock County (south)
 Putnam County (southwest)
 Henry County (west)

Demographics

2000 census
As of the census of 2000, there were 121,065 people, 45,172 households, and 29,678 families living in the county. The population density was 196 people per square mile (76/km2). There were 47,468 housing units at an average density of 77 per square mile (30/km2). The racial makeup of the county was 94.83% White, 1.27% Black or African American, 0.23% Native American, 1.03% Asian, 0.01% Pacific Islander, 1.45% from other races, and 1.18% from two or more races. 3.33% of the population were Hispanic or Latino of any race. 36.3% were of German, 9.9% American, 8.2% English, 8.0% Irish and 5.8% Polish ancestry according to Census 2000.

There were 45,172 households, out of which 32.00% had children under the age of 18 living with them, 53.90% were married couples living together, 8.50% had a female householder with no husband present, and 34.30% were non-families. 25.80% of all households were made up of individuals, and 9.10% had someone living alone who was 65 years of age or older. The average household size was 2.51 and the average family size was 3.04.

In the county, the population was spread out, with 23.70% under the age of 18, 17.20% from 18 to 24, 26.80% from 25 to 44, 21.30% from 45 to 64, and 11.00% who were 65 years of age or older. The median age was 33 years. For every 100 females there were 93.80 males. For every 100 females age 18 and over, there were 91.10 males.

The median income for a household in the county was $44,442, and the median income for a family was $56,468. Males had a median income of $40,419 versus $26,640 for females. The per capita income for the county was $21,284. About 4.70% of families and 9.60% of the population were below the poverty line, including 7.40% of those under age 18 and 5.80% of those age 65 or over.

2010 census
As of the 2010 United States Census, there were 125,488 people, 49,043 households, and 30,923 families living in the county. The racial makeup of the county was 92.8% white, 2.4% black or African American, 1.5% Asian, 0.2% American Indian, 1.3% from other races, and 1.7% from two or more races. Those of Hispanic or Latino origin made up 4.5% of the population. In terms of ancestry, 40.8% were German, 14.4% were Irish, 10.4% were English, 6.7% were Polish, and 5.2% were American.

Of the 49,043 households, 29.5% had children under the age of 18 living with them, 50.1% were married couples living together, 9.0% had a female householder with no husband present, 36.9% were non-families, and 27.5% of all households were made up of individuals. The average household size was 2.43 and the average family size was 2.98. The median age was 35.3 years.

The median income for a household in the county was $53,298 and the median income for a family was $69,768. Males had a median income of $51,038 versus $35,472 for females. The per capita income for the county was $26,671. About 6.4% of families and 12.2% of the population were below the poverty line, including 10.5% of those under age 18 and 6.3% of those age 65 or over.

Politics
Wood County formerly was a Republican stronghold county, but since 1964 the county has become a bellwether. Wood County has voted for the losing candidate twice since then, Gerald Ford in 1976 and Donald Trump in 2020.

|}

Government

County officials

Source:

Libraries

While there is no countywide library entity, the Wood County District Public Library serves Bowling Green and other portions of the county, not otherwise served by another library entity, from its main location in Bowling Green and a branch in Walbridge. In 2019, the library had a total circulation of 783,166 items and provided 1,473 programs to its patrons. Total holdings in 2019 were 158,861 print materials, 21,469 video recordings, 12,967 audio recordings, and 171 periodical subscriptions.

Additional libraries include:
 North Baltimore Public Library
 Pemberville Public Library, and branches in Luckey and Stony Ridge
 Rossford Public Library
 Way Public Library in Perrysburg
 Wayne Public Library
 Weston Public Library, and Grand Rapids branch

A small portion of the county located in the Fostoria city limits is served by the Kaubisch Memorial Public Library, located in the Seneca County portion of the city.

All Wood County and Fostoria library locations participate in Woodlink, a joint catalog system.

Communities

Cities
 Bowling Green (county seat)
 Fostoria (a small portion)
 Northwood
 Perrysburg
 Rossford

Villages

 Bairdstown
 Bloomdale
 Bradner
 Custar
 Cygnet
 Grand Rapids
 Haskins
 Hoytville
 Jerry City
 Luckey
 Millbury
 Milton Center
 North Baltimore
 Pemberville
 Portage
 Risingsun
 Tontogany
 Walbridge
 Wayne
 West Millgrove
 Weston

Townships

 Bloom
 Center
 Freedom
 Grand Rapids
 Henry
 Jackson
 Lake
 Liberty
 Middleton
 Milton
 Montgomery
 Perry
 Perrysburg
 Plain
 Portage
 Troy
 Washington
 Webster
 Weston

Census-designated places
 Rudolph
 Stony Ridge

Unincorporated communities

 Bays
 Bloom Center
 Cloverdale
 Denver
 Digby
 Dowling
 Ducat
 Dunbridge
 Eagleville
 Galatea
 Hammansburg
 Hatton
 Hull Prairie
 Lemoyne
 Lime City
 Mermill
 Moline
 Mungen
 New Rochester
 Otsego
 Scotch Ridge
 Six Points
 Sugar Ridge
 Trombley
 Wingston
 Woodside

Economy
According to the 2019 Wood County Comprehensive annual report, these were the largest employers in the county.

Community Resources

The Cocoon 
The Cocoon is a protective shelter for sexual and domestic violence victims in Wood County, Ohio. Beyond providing housing for survivors and their families, The Cocoon provides medical counsel, legal counsel, and support in finding permanent employment and residence. Organizing for the shelter began in 2000 with Bowling Green State University’s Women’s Center and Transformation Project in response to a rise in domestic violence homicides in Wood County. The Cocoon began operation in June 2005, and by 2012 all of its services were being conducted from its undisclosed location. By October 2015, The Cocoon had integrated sexual violence recovery and support as part of its programs.

Like many community organizations, The Cocoon faced sharp budget cuts during the Covid-19 Pandemic. When the United States began lock downs in March 2020, The Cocoon witnessed a forty percent increase in calls from survivors and a fifty percent increase in sexual violence reports. In 2019,  At the same time, the Victims of Crime Act’s fund, which provides The Cocoon with approximately half of its funding (approximately $300,000), was cut by thirty-nine percent in October 2020. Although this did not halt operations, it significantly impacted The Cocoon’s ability to provide comprehensive support for survivors.

In 2021, the American Rescue Plan Act granted Woods County $25 million in pandemic relief funds, of which Director Mulls requested $800,000. The Wood County Commissioners approved the request in March 2022. Commissioner Andrew Kalmar noted, “They’ve had a substantial reduction in revenue in the past few years, primarily because they’ve lost grant money from the federal government.”

See also
 National Register of Historic Places listings in Wood County, Ohio
 Wood County Courthouse and Jail
 Slippery Elm Trail

Footnotes

Further reading
 Robert L. Blake and Cathy J. Meadows, A History of Lake Township, Wood County, Ohio. Ada, OH: Ada Herald, 1998.
 Michael E. Brooks, The Ku Klux Klan in Wood County, Ohio. Charleston, SC: Arcadia Publishing/The History Press, 2014.
 Richard M. Helwig, Wood County. Galena, OH: Center for Ghost Town Research in Ohio, 1990.
 Henry Howe, History of Wood County, Ohio, 1820-1889. Knightstown, IN: Bookmark, 1977.
 Paul Willis Jones, Human Interest History of Wood County, Ohio. Bowling Green, OH: Wood County Chapter of the Ohio Genealogical Society, 2007.
 M.A. Leeson, Commemorative historical and biographical record of Wood County, Ohio : its past and present : early settlement and development ... biographies and portraits of early settlers and representative citizens, etc. Chicago, IL: J.H. Beers & Co., 1897.
 Daniel A Masters, Index to the Civil War Letters of Wood County, Ohio: From the Pages of the Wood County Independent and the Perrysburg Journal. n.c.: Daniel A. Masters, 2003.
 John P. Nass, A Description and Quantitative Analysis of Artifacts Recovered from Fort Meigs (1813-1815), Wood County, Ohio. MA thesis. Western Michigan University, 1980.
 Wood County Historical Society, Black Swamp Chanticleer: Newsletter of the Wood County Historical Society. Bowling Green, OH: Wood County Historical Society, 1973-
 Wood County Historical Society, Pioneers of Wood County, Ohio: A Listing of Family Surnames Taken from a Commemorative, Historical and Biographical Record of Wood County, Ohio. Evansville, IN: Unigraphic, 1973.
 A Brief History of Wood County and Bowling Green. Bowling Green, OH: n.p., 1908. OCLC 6545954.
 History and Government of Wood County, Ohio: Sesquicentennial 1803-1953. Bowling Green, OH: Wood County Board of Education, 1953.

External links
 Wood County Government's website

 
1820 establishments in Ohio
Populated places established in 1820